Pedro Miguel Oliveira Ganhão (born 10 April 1984) is a Portuguese football player who plays for Casa Pia.

Club career
He made his professional debut in the Segunda Liga for Carregado on 26 September 2009 in a game against Desportivo Aves.

References

1984 births
People from Benavente, Portugal
Living people
Portuguese footballers
Liga Portugal 2 players
Casa Pia A.C. players
Association football midfielders
Sportspeople from Santarém District